The Wooster Group is a New York City-based experimental theater company known for creating numerous original dramatic works. It gradually emerged from Richard Schechner's The Performance Group (1967–1980) during the period from 1975 to 1980, and took its name in 1980; the independent productions of 1975–1980 are retroactively attributed to the Group.

The ensemble is directed by Elizabeth LeCompte and has launched the careers of many actors, including founding member Willem Dafoe. The Group's home is the Performing Garage at 33 Wooster Street between Grand and Broome Streets in the SoHo neighborhood of Manhattan. As of 2014, the company consists of 16 members.  In addition, there are 29 "Associates".

The Wooster Group is a not-for-profit theater company that relies on grants and donations from supporters. It has received multiple grants from the Carnegie Corporation. The Wooster Group are characterized by their extremely experimental style, often incorporating aspects of audiovisual such as interactive video art, live stream, recorded sound and pre-recorded video into their performance work. Their performances are often of classic texts such as Brecht, Shakespeare, Chekhov and Eugene O'Neill.

Founding members 

 Elizabeth LeCompte
 Willem Dafoe
 Jim Clayburgh
 Spalding Gray (d. 2004)
 Peyton Smith
 Kate Valk
 Ron Vawter (d. 1994)

Current Company 

 Irfan Brkovic
 Matthew Dipple
 Mike Farry
 Ari Fliakos
 Clay Hapaz
 Cynthia Hedstrom
 Gareth Hobbs
 Elizabeth LeCompte
 Bona Lee
 Michaela Murphy
 Erin Mullin
 Monika Wunderer
 Scott Shepherd
 Eric Sluyter
 Kate Valk

Awards and honors
The Wooster Group has won nine Obie Awards, six Bessie Awards, and the 1985 National Endowment for the Arts Ongoing Ensembles Grant.

Further reading 
 
 Quick, Andrew. The Wooster Group Workbook, London: Routledge, 2007. 
 Savran, David. Breaking the Rules: The Wooster Group. New York: Theatre Communications Group, 1990.

References

External links

 

American artist groups and collectives
Performance art in New York City
Theatre companies in New York City
Performing groups established in 1975
1975 establishments in New York City